Nangō-Jūhatchōme Station (南郷18丁目駅) is a Sapporo Municipal Subway station in Shiroishi-ku, Sapporo, Hokkaido, Japan. The station number is T16.

Platforms

Surrounding area
 Japan National Route 12 (to Asahikawa)
 Sapporo Tokushukai Hospital
 Shiroishi Juhachinango Post Office
 Shiraishi Higashishiroishi Police station
 Tokou Store, Nango Jūhatchōme branch
 Sapporo International Exchange building
 JICA Sapporo building
 Sapporo City Agricultural Cooperative Association (JA Sapporo), Higashi-shiroishi branch
 Higashi Shiroishi Adventure Park (site of the old JNR Oyachi station)
 Lucy store, CO-OP Sapporo
 Hokkaido Bank, Distribution center
 North Pacific Bank, Higashishiroishi branch

External links

 Sapporo Subway Stations

 

Railway stations in Japan opened in 1982
Railway stations in Sapporo
Sapporo Municipal Subway